Ammatus also spelled Ammatas was a Vandal noble and military leader. He was the brother of the Vandal king Gelimer. He had the previous Vandal king, Hilderic, executed on the orders of his brother. On his brother's orders he moved to support Gelimer himself in repulsing a Byzantine invasion at Ad Decimum. During the battle there he was killed.

References

Vandal warriors
6th-century Germanic people
Vandalic War
533 deaths